The year 1970 in science and technology involved some significant events, listed below.

Astronomy and space exploration
 February 11 – Japan becomes the fourth country to launch a satellite into orbit.
 March 31 – Explorer I reentry (after 12 years in orbit)
 April 11 – Apollo 13 ill-fated space mission launched
 April 17 – Apollo 13 returns safely to Earth
 August 17 – Venera program: Venera 7 is launched. It will later becomes the first spacecraft to successfully transmit data from another planet.
 November 17 – Luna program: The Soviet Union lands Lunokhod 1 on Mare Imbrium (Sea of Rains) on the Moon. This is the first roving remote-controlled robot to land on another world and was released by the orbiting Luna 17 spacecraft.

Biology
 Establishment of Parc naturel régional de Camargue in the south of France.

Chemistry
 August – Ulrich K. Laemmli publishes his refinement of the SDS-PAGE method.

Computer science
 January 1 – Unix time begins at 00:00:00 UTC.
 June–August – FLOW (programming language) devised by Jef Raskin.
 November 17 – Douglas Engelbart receives a United States patent for the first computer mouse.
 Datapoint 2200 is announced. A mass-produced programmable terminal, designed by Computer Terminal Corporation (CTC) founders Phil Ray and Gus Roche.
 Len Deighton's 1943-set Bomber, published this year in England, is the first novel written on a word processor, the IBM MT/ST.
 Niklaus Wirth releases the first Pascal compiler.
 Xerox PARC computer laboratory opens in Palo Alto, California.

Earth sciences
 January 4 – The 7.1  Tonghai earthquake shakes Tonghai County, Yunnan province, China, with a maximum Mercalli intensity of X (Extreme). Between 10,000–14,621 are killed and 26,783 injured.
 May 24 – Kola Superdeep Borehole drilling begins on the Kola Peninsula of Russia.

Mathematics
 Conway's Game of Life cellular automaton devised by John Horton Conway.
 Mathematician Kurt Gödel allows circulation of his ontological proof of the existence of God.

Medicine
 The Dubowitz Score for estimating the gestational age of babies is published by Lilly and Victor Dubowitz.
 The Exeter hip replacement stem, developed by surgeon Robin Ling and engineer Clive Lee, is first implanted, at the Princess Elizabeth Orthopaedic Hospital in Exeter, England.
 First cases of monkeypox in humans identified in the Democratic Republic of the Congo.

Physics
 Prediction of the GIM mechanism, requiring the existence of a charm quark, by Sheldon Glashow, John Iliopoulos and Luciano Maiani.

Psychology
 Henri Tajfel develops his minimal group paradigm, a constituent of social identity theory.
 Studies in Animal and Human Behavior, Volume I is published by Konrad Lorenz.

Technology
 June 2 – Cleddau Bridge in Wales collapses during erection, killing four, leading to introduction of new standards for box girder bridges in the United Kingdom.

Events
 June 19 – The Patent Cooperation Treaty is signed into international law, providing a unified procedure for filing patent applications to protect inventions.

Awards
 Fields Prize in Mathematics: Alan Baker, Heisuke Hironaka, Sergei Novikov and John Griggs Thompson
 Nobel Prizes
 Physics – Hannes Alfvén, Louis Néel
 Chemistry – Luis F. Leloir
 Medicine – Bernard Katz, Ulf von Euler, Julius Axelrod
 Turing Award – James H. Wilkinson

Births
 March 27 – Eleanor Maguire, Irish-born neuropsychologist.
 August 1 – Elon Lindenstrauss, Israeli mathematician.
 September 3 – Stanislav Smirnov, Russian-born mathematician.

Deaths
 January 5 – Max Born (b. 1882), German physicist and recipient of the Nobel Prize in physics in 1954.
 January 27 – Marietta Blau (b. 1894), Austrian physicist.
 April 27 – Orii Hyōjirō (b. 1883), Japanese animal specimen collector.
 May 1 – Ralph Hartley (b. 1888), American electrical engineer.
 July 20 – Margaret Reed Lewis (b. 1881), American cell biologist.
 July 29 – Emanuel Miller (b. 1892), British child psychiatrist.
 August 1 – Otto Heinrich Warburg (b. 1883), German physiologist and winner of the 1931 Nobel Prize in Physiology or Medicine.
 September 22 – Vojtěch Jarník (b. 1897), Czech mathematician.

References

 
20th century in science
1970s in science